Romics is a semiannual comic book, animation, and gaming convention in Rome, Lazio (Italy). The event takes place over four days, usually during April for the spring edition, and October for the autumn one. Until the twelfth edition in 2012, it was held annually, most often in October. The event is held, for both its editions, in the Rome trade fair district.

Luca Raffaelli directed the event from its first edition to its 11th.

The Gala includes awards for dubbing in several categories.

Editions 

First edition (22-23-24-25 November 2001)
Second edition (3-4-5-6 October 2002)
Third edition (2-3-4-5 October 2003)
Fourth edition  (7-8-9-10 October 2004)
Fifth edition (2-3-4-5 October 2005)
Sixth edition (5-6-7-8 October 2006)
Seventh edition (4-5-6-7 October 2007)
Eighth  edition (2-3-4-5 October 2008)
Ninth edition (8-9-10-11 October 2009)
Tenth edition (30 September, 1-2-3 October 2010)
Eleventh edition (29-30 September, 1–2 October 2011)
Twelfth edition (27-28-29-30 September 2012)
Thirteenth edition (4-5-6-7 April 2013)
Fourteenth edition (3-4-5-6 October 2013)
Fifteenth edition (3-4-5-6 April 2014)
 Sixteenth edition (2-3-4-5 October 2014)
 Seventeenth edition (9-10-11-12 April 2015)
 Eighteenth edition (1-2-3-4 October 2015)
 Nineteenth edition (7-8-9-10 April 2016)
 Twentieth edition (29-30 September, 1–2 October 2016)
 Twenty-first edition (2017)
 Twenty-second edition (2017)
 Twenty-third edition (2018)
 Twenty-fourth edition (2018)

References

External links 

 Official Romics website

Comics conventions
Gaming conventions
Multigenre conventions
Tourist attractions in Rome
Recurring events established in 2001
2001 establishments in Italy